The Workers' United Center of Chile (CUT) is a union federation in Chile. The CUT was founded in 1953, but it was suppressed after the Chilean coup of 1973. It was refounded in September 1988 near the end of Augusto Pinochet's dictatorship.

The CUT is affiliated with the International Trade Union Confederation (ITUC).

See also 

Clotario Blest (1899–1990)
Strikes at Escondida mines, August 2006

References

External links
 Official web site

Trade unions in Chile
International Trade Union Confederation
Trade unions established in 1988